Hui Lan Zhang is an internationally recognized yoga teacher, popularly known as Wai Lana in the West. Wai Lana has influenced billions in the world, especially among Chinese. Inspired by her teacher, Wai Lana introduced yoga to China in the late 1970s—long before yoga became popular in the West. Her popular television series "Yoga" started airing in China on CCTV since 1985, 3 times a day every day. The series was so popular it became one of the longest running television series in China’s history, airing nationwide uninterrupted from 1985 to 2000, earning her the moniker “Mother of Yoga to modern China.”

Wai Lana later produced her Wai Lana Yoga series for public television in the United States where it has been airing nationwide since 1998 and is still airing today after 18 years—making it the longest-running fitness series ever on public television. Wai Lana Yoga has also aired internationally on five continents: North and South America, Asia, Europe, Australia and the Middle East.

To help further popularize yoga, Wai Lana started selling her music CDs, yoga instructional DVDs, and other yoga lifestyle products through different online and offline retail channels. Besides her several books on the practice of Yoga, she has also published two books on cuisine, Wai Lana's Favorite Juices and Wai Lana's Favorite Soups, her Easy Meditation for Everyone Kit, as well as many children's yoga products, including Wai Lana’s Little Yogis Daydream Kit, Fun Songs Cartoon & CD, and Little Yogis DVDs & Books.

In 2015, Wai Lana produced her acclaimed Namaste music video to celebrate the first ever International Day of Yoga on June 21. She wrote the Namaste song to communicate the core values of the yoga way of life—universal brotherhood and love. Namaste was presented at the headline event held by the United Nations at their headquarters in New York City and was streamed live to tens of thousands of yoga lovers gathered at Times Square.  To date, her Namaste video has been viewed and listened to over 4 million times.

In 2016, Wai Lana was honored by the Government of India with the prestigious Padma Shri Award for her extraordinary achievements in popularizing yoga globally through her television series, videos, and books. She is only the second Chinese national ever to receive this honor in its 62-year history.

In 2016, to honor the 2nd Annual International Day of Yoga on June 21, Wai Lana released her new Alive Forever short film and music video.

Wai Lana is married to Chris Butler, the founder of the Science of Identity and the spiritual leader of U.S. Representative Tulsi Gabbard.

Selected bibliography

See also 
 Wai Lana Yoga

References

External links 
 
 

Recipients of the Padma Shri in other fields
1955 births
Chinese mass media people
Chinese non-fiction writers
Chinese television personalities
Yoga teachers
Chinese children's writers
Chinese women children's writers
Living people